Bernard Patrick Holm (May 22, 1908 – July 15, 1978), nicknamed Tony Holm, was a professional American football player. In his four seasons in the NFL he played punter and quarterback. In 1933 he became the first quarterback for the now Pittsburgh Steelers. He was born in Birmingham, Alabama. Holm played college football for Wallace Wade's Alabama Crimson Tide football teams, earning All-America honors in 1929. "Wade's big express-train fullback, Tom Holm, is in the south all of what Al Marsters and Chris Cagle are in the east. His greatest game was in a 33–13 loss to Georgia Tech.

References

Tony Holm's obituary

Pittsburgh Steelers players
American football quarterbacks
1908 births
1978 deaths
Alabama Crimson Tide football players
All-Southern college football players